Vittoria Belvedere (born 17 January 1972) is an Italian actress from Vibo Valentia in Calabria, southern Italy. She has appeared in several films but most of her work is television based.

Career
In 1992, she made her debut in the film In camera mia, directed by Luciano Martino. In 1993, she appeared in the mini-series Delitti privati, directed by Sergio Martino.
 
She played Julia the Elder in the Anglo-Italian mini series Imperium: Augustus.

She hosted the 2003 edition of Sanremo Festival with Pippo Baudo and Manuela Arcuri.

In 2006, she starred in 10 episodes of the Italian romantic drama series Nati ieri.

Personal life
She is married to Vasco Valerio, an executive TV producer and has three children.

Filmography

Cinema 
 1992 - In camera mia, directed by Luciano Martino
 1992 - Zoloto, directed by Fabio Bonzi
 1993 - Graffiante desiderio, directed by Sergio Martino
 1994 - Ritorno a Parigi, directed by Maurizio Rasio
 1998 - Passaggio per il paradiso, directed by Antonio Baiocco
 1999 - La spiaggia, directed by Mauro Cappelloni
 2000 - Si fa presto a dire amore, directed by Enrico Brignano
 2004 - La lettera, directed by Luciano Cannito
 2008 - ((Cascia)) Saint Rita
 2012 - The Immature: The Trip, directed by Paolo Genovese

Television 
 1993 - Piazza di Spagna, directed by Florestano Vancini
 1993 - Delitti privati, directed by Sergio Martino
 1993 - La famiglia Ricordi, directed by Mauro Bolognini
 1995 - Arsène Lupin, directed by Vittorio De Sisti
 1996 - Commandant Nerval, directed by Henri Helman e Arnaud Sélignac
 1996 - Il ritorno di Sandokan, directed by Enzo G. Castellari
 1998 - Provincia segreta, directed by Francesco Massaro
 1998 - Trenta righe per un delitto, directed by Lodovico Gasparini
 1998 - Lui e lei, directed by Luciano Manuzzi
 1998 - Le ragazze di Piazza di Spagna, directed by José María Sánchez
 1999 - Le ragazze di Piazza di Spagna 2, directed by Gianfranco Lazotti
 1999 - Lui e lei 2, directed by Elisabetta Lodoli e Luciano Manuzzi
 1999 - Riding the storm, directed by Bernd Böhlich
 2000 - Senso di colpa, directed by Massimo Spano
 2000 - Le ragazze di Piazza di Spagna 3, directed by Riccardo Donna
 2001 - L'uomo che piaceva alle donne - Bel Ami, directed by Massimo Spano
 2002 - San Giovanni - L'Apocalisse, directed by Raffaele Mertes
 2003 - ICS - L'amore ti dà un nome, directed by Alberto Negrin
 2003 - Imperium: Augustus, directed by Roger Young
 2003 - Nessuno al posto suo, directed by Gianfranco Albano
 2004 - Part Time, directed by Angelo Longoni
 2004 - Saint Rita, directed by Giorgio Capitani
 2005 - Padri e figli, directed by Gianfranco Albano e Gianni Zanasi
 2005 - Il bambino sull'acqua, directed by Paolo Bianchini
 2005 - Il mio amico Babbo Natale, directed by Franco Amurri
 2005 - Giovanni Paolo II, directed by John Kent Harrison
 2006 - Nati ieri, directed by Carmine Elia, Paolo Genovese and Luca Miniero
 2007 - Viaggio in Italia - Una favola vera, directed by Paolo Genovese and Luca Miniero
 2010 - Crimini, directed by Claudio Bonivento
 2013 - Un caso di coscienza, directed by Luigi Perelli

External links
 Official website 
 

1972 births
Living people
People from Calabria
People from Vibo Valentia
Italian television actresses
Italian film actresses
20th-century Italian actresses
21st-century Italian actresses
People of Calabrian descent